Monroe Heath (March 27, 1827October 21, 1894) was a U.S. politician. He served as Mayor of Chicago, Illinois (1876–1879) for the Republican Party, after winning the 1876 election. He was subsequently reelected the following year, defeating Perry H. Smith.

Early life and career
Born in Grafton, New Hampshire, he took part in the California Gold Rush in 1849. In 1851, he founded the Heath & Milligan Manufacturing Company in Chicago. Illinois. He served on the Chicago City Council 1871–1876.

He served as a Chicago alderman, representing Chicago's 12th ward.

Mayoralty
After winning the 1876 election, Heath was sworn in as Mayor of Chicago on July 24, 1876.

He was subsequently reelected the following year, defeating Perry H. Smith.

He was sworn-in for his second term on April 30, 1877.

His tenure as mayor ended on April 28, 1879.

Post-mayoralty
He died in Asheville, North Carolina. He is buried in Oak Woods Cemetery.

Notes

1827 births
1894 deaths
People from Grafton, New Hampshire
People of the California Gold Rush
Businesspeople from Illinois
Illinois Republicans
Chicago City Council members
Mayors of Chicago
19th-century American politicians
19th-century American businesspeople